Mera Madhya Pradesh  is the state song of the Indian state of Madhya Pradesh. The song was written by Mahesh Shrivastava and was officially adopted in October 2010.

Lyrics

See also
 List of Indian state songs

References

External links
Mera Madhya Pradesh

Indian state songs
Symbols of Madhya Pradesh